Thomas Murphy (1821 – August 17, 1901) was an Irish-American businessman and politician from New York City, serving as a New York state senator for a total of three terms, 1866 through 1867, and in 1879. He had joined the Republican Party and made his fortune selling equipment to the Union Army during the American Civil War. Afterward, he became part of the political machine run by US Senator from New York Roscoe Conkling, and was appointed as the Collector of the Port of New York from 1870 to 1871.

Life
Murphy was born in Ireland in 1821.  He emigrated to the United States as a young man and entered the fur business.  He became interested in politics, joining first the Whig party and later the Republicans.

In 1848, he married Mary Gibbs (died 1897), and they had five children.  Their son, Edgar Gibbs Murphy, became well known as a champion pigeon-shooter. Another son, Thomas Vinton Murphy, married Cora Howarth. They had a business running munitions and a gambling house in the 1880s.

Murphy made his fortune selling equipment to the Union Army during the American Civil War, and soon thereafter became involved with the Republican political machine run by Roscoe Conkling. He was a member of the New York State Senate (7th D.) in 1866 and 1867.  In 1870, Conkling asked President Ulysses S. Grant to appoint Murphy to the office of Collector.  Murphy antagonized other New York Republican factions by firing their members from Custom House jobs and replacing them with men loyal to Conkling. Murphy became sufficiently unpopular so that Grant was forced to replace him, appointing Murphy's friend, Chester A. Arthur, to the post in his place.

After his removal, Murphy ran for Congress from New York's 9th congressional district, but was defeated. He was elected again as a member of the State Senate in 1879.

He eventually owned a horse farm in Deal, New Jersey. He died at his home in 1901 of kidney disease. His funeral was held at St. Patrick's Cathedral in New York.  He was buried at Woodlawn Cemetery in the Bronx.

Footnotes

1821 births
1901 deaths
Politicians from New York City
Collectors of the Port of New York
Irish emigrants to the United States (before 1923)
New York (state) Whigs
19th-century American politicians
New York (state) Republicans
Deaths from kidney disease
People from Deal, New Jersey